In mathematics, a Casimir element (also known as a Casimir invariant or Casimir operator) is a distinguished element of the center of the universal enveloping algebra of a Lie algebra. A prototypical example is the squared angular momentum operator, which is a Casimir element of the three-dimensional rotation group.

More generally, Casimir elements can be used to refer to any element of the center of the universal enveloping algebra. The algebra of these elements is known to be isomorphic to a polynomial algebra through the Harish-Chandra isomorphism.

The Casimir element is named after Hendrik Casimir, who identified them in his description of rigid body dynamics in 1931.

Definition 

The most commonly-used Casimir invariant is the quadratic invariant.  It is the simplest to define, and so is given first. However, one may also have Casimir invariants of higher order, which correspond to homogeneous symmetric polynomials of higher order.

Quadratic Casimir element

Suppose that  is an -dimensional Lie algebra. (The most typical choice of B is the Killing form if  is semisimple.)
Let

Although the definition relies on a choice of basis for the Lie algebra, it is easy to show that Ω is independent of this choice. On the other hand, Ω  does depend on the bilinear form B. The invariance of B implies that the Casimir element commutes with all elements of the Lie algebra , and hence lies in the center of the universal enveloping algebra .

Quadratic Casimir invariant of a linear representation and of a smooth action

A specific form of this construction plays an important role in differential geometry and global analysis.

Specializing further, if it happens that M has a Riemannian metric on which G acts transitively by isometries, and the stabilizer subgroup Gx of a point acts irreducibly on the tangent space of M at x, then the Casimir invariant of ρ is a scalar multiple of the Laplacian operator coming from the metric. 

More general Casimir invariants may also be defined, commonly occurring in the study of pseudo-differential operators in Fredholm theory.

Casimir elements of higher order

The article on universal enveloping algebras gives a detailed, precise definition of Casimir operators, and an exposition of some of their properties. All Casimir operators correspond to symmetric homogeneous polynomials in the symmetric algebra of the adjoint representation :

where  is the order of the symmetric tensor  and the  form a vector space basis of  This corresponds to a symmetric homogeneous polynomial

in  indeterminate variables  in the polynomial algebra  over a field  The reason for the symmetry follows from the PBW theorem and is discussed in much greater detail in the article on universal enveloping algebras.

Moreover, a Casimir element must belong to the center of the universal enveloping algebra, i.e. it must obey

for all basis elements  
In terms of the corresponding symmetric tensor , this condition is equivalent to the tensor being invariant:

where  is a structure constants of the Lie algebra i.e. .

Properties

Uniqueness of the quadratic Casimir element

Since for a simple Lie algebra every invariant bilinear form is a multiple of the Killing form, the corresponding Casimir element is uniquely defined up to a constant. For a general semisimple Lie algebra, the space of invariant bilinear forms has one basis vector for each simple component, and hence the same is true for the space of corresponding Casimir operators.

Relation to the Laplacian on G

Casimir elements and representation theory

By Racah's theorem, for a semisimple Lie algebra the dimension of the center of the universal enveloping algebra is equal to its rank. The Casimir operator gives the concept of the Laplacian on a general semisimple Lie group; but there is no unique analogue of the Laplacian, for rank > 1.

By definition any member of the center of the universal enveloping algebra commutes with all other elements in the algebra. By Schur's Lemma, in any irreducible representation of the Lie algebra, any Casimir element is thus proportional to the identity.  The eigenvalues of all Casimir elements can be used to classify the representations of the Lie algebra (and hence, also of its Lie group). 

Physical mass and spin are examples of these eigenvalues, as are many other quantum numbers found in quantum mechanics. Superficially, topological quantum numbers form an exception to this pattern; although deeper theories hint that these are two facets of the same phenomenon..

Let  be the finite dimensional highest weight module of weight .
 
where  is the weight defined by half the sum of the positive roots. 
If  is nontrivial (i.e. if ), then this constant is nonzero. This observation plays an important role in the proof of Weyl's theorem on complete reducibility. It is also possible to prove the nonvanishing of the eigenvalue in a more abstract way—without using an explicit formula for the eigenvalue—using Cartan's criterion; see Sections 4.3 and 6.2 in the book of Humphreys.

Symmetric invariant tensors of simple Lie algebras

A Casimir element of order  corresponds to a symmetric invariant tensor of the same order via . Constructing and relating Casimir elements is equivalent to doing the same for symmetric invariant tensors.

Construction of symmetric invariant tensors 

Symmetric invariant tensors may be constructed as symmetrized traces in the defining representation 

where indices are raised and lowered by the Killing form, and symmetrized under all permutations.

It is also possible to construct symmetric invariant tensors from the antisymmetric invariant tensors of the type 

The symmetric invariant tensor 

Such invariant tensors are orthogonal to one another in the sense that  if .

In the case of the simple Lie algebra , 
let us introduce the fully symmetric tensor of order three  such that, in the defining representation, 

Then the Sudbery symmetric invariant tensors are

Relations between symmetric invariant tensors 

For a simple Lie algebra of rank , there are  algebraically independent symmetric invariant tensors. Therefore, any such tensor can be expressed in terms of  given tensors. There is a systematic method for deriving complete sets of identities between symmetric invariant tensors.

In the case of the Lie algebra , the symmetric invariant tensors  obey . 

Structure constants also obey identities that are not directly related to symmetric invariant tensors, for example

Examples

Case of  

The Lie algebra  consists of two-by-two complex matrices with zero trace.

The commutators are

One can show that the Casimir element is

Case of  

The Lie algebra  is the Lie algebra of SO(3), the rotation group for three-dimensional Euclidean space.  It is simple of rank 1, and so it has a single independent Casimir. The Killing form for the rotation group is just the Kronecker delta, and so the Casimir invariant is simply the sum of the squares of the generators  of the algebra.  That is, the Casimir invariant is given by

The invariance of the Casimir operator implies that it is a multiple of the identity operator . This constant can be computed explicitly, giving the following result

In quantum mechanics, the scalar value  is referred to as the total angular momentum. For finite-dimensional matrix-valued representations of the rotation group,  always takes on integer values (for bosonic representations) or half-integer values (for fermionic representations).

The quadratic Casimir invariant can then easily be computed by hand, with the result that

as  when . Similarly, the two dimensional representation has a basis given by the Pauli matrices, which correspond to spin , and one can again check the formula for the Casimir by direct computation.

See also
Harish-Chandra isomorphism
Pauli–Lubanski pseudovector
Clebsch–Gordan coefficients

References

Further reading
 
 
 https://mathoverflow.net/questions/74689/motivating-the-casimir-element

Representation theory of Lie groups
Lie algebras